Cynosurus is a genus of Eurasian and North African plants in the grass family. Plants in this genus are known generally as dogstail grass. They are native to the Mediterranean Basin and neighboring regions, but some have been introduced into Australia as well as North and South America.

 Species
 Cynosurus balansae Coss. & Durieu - Morocco, Algeria
 Cynosurus coloratus Lehm. ex Steud.  - Crete, Cyprus, Lebanon, Palestine, Israel, Egypt, Libya, Tunisia
 Cynosurus cristatus L. - Europe, Azores, Caucasus, Iran, Turkey
 Cynosurus echinatus L. - southern Europe, north Africa, Azores, Madeira, Canary Islands, Middle East, Caucasus, Turkmenistan; naturalized in Australia as well as North and South America
 Cynosurus elegans Desf. - southern Europe, north Africa, Middle East, Turkmenistan
 Cynosurus junceus Murb. - Libya
 Cynosurus peltieri Maire - Algeria, Tunisia
 Cynosurus polybracteatus Poir. - Algeria, Tunisia
 Cynosurus turcomanicus Proskur. - Turkmenistan

 formerly included
Numerous names have been coined using the name Cynosurus, applied to species now regarded as better suited to other genera (Aegopogon Apera Beckmannia Bouteloua Centotheca Chloris Coelachyrum Cynodon Dactyloctenium Desmostachya Dinebra Eleusine Enteropogon Festuca Harpochloa Lamarckia Leptochloa Ochthochloa Oreochloa Polypogon Rostraria Sclerochloa Sesleria Sesleriella Tribolium Wangenheimia). Here are links to help you find the appropriate information

References

Pooideae
Poaceae genera